The 2019 IHF Men's Junior World Championship (under-21) was the 22nd edition of the tournament, held from 16 to 28 July 2019 in Vigo and Pontevedra, Spain. It was the second time that Spain stage the competition, and the fifteenth time that it was held in Europe.

France secured their second title after defeating Croatia in the final.

Qualified teams

Draw
The draw was held on 21 May 2019 in Pontevedra, Spain.

Seedings
The seedings were announced on 18 April 2019.

Preliminary round
All times are local (UTC+2).

Group A

Group B

Group C

Group D

President's Cup
17th place bracket

21st place bracket

21st–24th place semifinals

17th–20th place semifinals

23rd place game

21st place game

19th place game

17th place game

9–16th placement games
The eight losers of the round of 16 are seeded according to their results in the preliminary round against teams ranked 1–4 and play an elimination game to determine their final position.

Standings

15th place game

13th place game

Eleventh place game

Ninth place game

Knockout stage

5th place bracket

Round of 16

Quarterfinals

5th–8th place semifinals

Semifinals

Seventh place game

Fifth place game

Third place game

Final

Final ranking

Statistics

Top goalscorers

Source: IHF

Top goalkeepers

Source: IHF

Awards
The MVP and all-star team were announced on 28 July 2019.

MVP
 Ivan Martinović

All-star team
Goalkeeper:  Valentin Kieffer
Right wing:  Fran Mileta
Right back:  Diogo Silva
Centre back:  Kyllian Villeminot
Left back:  Emil Lærke
Left wing:  Dylan Nahi
Pivot:  Luís Frade

References

External links
Official website
IHF website

2019 Junior
Men's Junior World Handball Championship
International handball competitions hosted by Spain
2019 in Spanish sport
Men's Junior World Handball Championship